Kali Ongala (born August 31, 1979) is a former Young Africans S.C. and GIF Sundsvall midfielder. He currently coaches Azam FC.

Career
Ongala began playing football with Young Africans S.C. in 1999. He went abroad for trials in England and the United States, before landing professional contracts in Sweden with FC Väsby United and GIF Sundsvall. Kali now works for a football agency called Onresa Football Agency with his partner Yusuf Bakhresa. 

Kali is also the son of Tanzanian musician late Remmy Ongala.

References

External links 
 GIF Sundsvall profile 

1979 births
Living people
Tanzanian footballers
Tanzania international footballers
Tanzanian expatriate footballers
Allsvenskan players
Young Africans S.C. players
GIF Sundsvall players
Expatriate footballers in Sweden
AFC Eskilstuna players
Montego Bay United F.C. players
Azam F.C. managers

Association football midfielders
Tanzanian football managers
Tanzanian Premier League players